A treehouse, tree house, or treefort is a habitable structure built in trees.

"Treehouse" may also refer to:

Education
 Treehouse (company), a for-profit education company.

Structures
 Tree House, Crawley, a listed 14th-century building in Crawley, West Sussex, United Kingdom; originally the manor house.
 Pear Tree House Civil Defence Control Center for South-East London.
 The Tree House, a 21-story student residence at Massachusetts College of Art and Design

Places
 TreeHouse School, a special school in London, United Kingdom that specialises in educating children and young people with autism.

Entertainment
 Treehouse TV, a Canadian preschool television station owned by YTV (Corus Entertainment)
 Treehouse of Horror (series), the annual Halloween special on the television series The Simpsons
 "Treehouse" (Modern Family) an episode of the American sitcom Modern Family
 "Treehouse", a hackers' paradise from the book Otherland: City of Golden Shadow by Tad Williams
 Treehouse (The Grapes of Wrath album), a 1987 album by The Grapes of Wrath
 Tree House (Franciscus Henri album), an album by Franciscus Henri
 Treehouse (I See Stars album), an album by American rock band I See Stars
 Treehouse (Sofi Tukker album), an album by American electronic duo Sofi Tukker
 "Treehouse" (song), a 2019 song by James Arthur and Ty Dolla Sign featuring Shotty Horroh
 "Tree House" an episode of the Nickelodeon sitcom Drake & Josh
 The Treehouse, an educational game by Brøderbund Software
 Magic Tree House series of children's books by Mary Pope Osbourne
 Magic Tree House anime film based on the children's books
 Treehouse, 2014 released horror film
 "Treehouse" (Into the Dark), an episode of the first season of Into the Dark

Other
 Tree House Brewing Company, a brewery in Charlton, Massachusetts
 TreeHouse Foods, food processing company.
 Treehouse (game), a boardgame using Icehouse pieces.
 "Treefort" – the shorthand colloquial term for the Treefort Music Fest, an indie music festival held in Boise, Idaho.
 Creepy treehouse, a social media term